Homowo is a harvest festival celebrated by the Ga people of Ghana in the Greater Accra Region. The festival starts in the month of 
August with the planting of crops (mainly maize and yam) before the rainy season starts. During the festival, they perform a dance called Kpanlogo. The Ga people celebrate Homowo in the remembrance of the famine that once happened in their history in precolonial Ghana.

Etymology 
The word Homowo (Homo - hunger, wo - hoot) can mean "to hoot (or jeer) at hunger" in the Ga language. The tradition of Homowo started with a period of hunger leading to famine due to failure of the seasonal rains needed by crops in the Greater Accra Region, where the Ga people  dwell.  When the rains returned to normal, the Ga people celebrated it by creating the Homowo festival, hence its name and meaning.

Celebration/Observance 
Homowo is greatly celebrated in all the towns in the Ga state with celebrations climaxing in Gamashie. The celebration begins with the planting of maize, which will be used in preparing the food for the festival named Kpokpoi or Kpekple. During this period, noise making is prohibited or banned since it is believed that it will hinder the maturity of the crop. The meal is eaten with Palm Nut Soup and it is also sprinkled within the town. This is normally done by traditional leaders and family heads. All family heads sprinkle the "kpokpoi" in their family house. Celebration includes marching down roads and streets beating drums, chanting, merrymaking  face painting, singing and traditional dances. On this day there is usually a lot of traffic and roads are usually blocked off to accommodate the festival. Even though it is a Ga tradition, many other ethnic groups are welcomed to also join in the celebration.

Some of the towns that celebrate Homowo are La, Teshie, Teshie Nungua, Osu, Ga-Mashie, Tema, Prampram, and Ningo.

Gallery

See also
 Culture of Ghana

References

External links 
 
 Promoting and celebrating Homowo with Obo Addy

Ghanaian culture
Festivals in Ghana
May observances
Spring festivals